Andy Field may refer to:

 Andy Field (academic) (born 1973),  professor for psychology at University of Sussex
 Andy Field (blogger) (born 1983),  artist, blogger, curator and academic